Arsenal Football Club, an association football club based in Islington, London, was founded in 1886 as Dial Square. They became the first southern member admitted into the Football League in 1893, having spent their first four seasons solely participating in cup tournaments and friendlies. The club's name, which shortly changed to Woolwich Arsenal, was shortened to Arsenal in 1914, a year after moving to Highbury. Despite finishing fifth in the Second Division in 1914–15, Arsenal rejoined the First Division at the expense of local rivals Tottenham Hotspur when football resumed after the First World War. Since that time, they have not fallen below the first tier of the English football league system and hold the record for the longest uninterrupted period in the top flight. The club's first team have competed in numerous nationally and internationally organised competitions, and all players who have played between 25 and 99 such matches, either as a member of the starting eleven or as a substitute, are listed below.

Each player's details include the duration of his Arsenal career, his typical playing position while with the club, and the number of games played and goals scored in all senior competitive matches. Two of these players, Tom Whittaker and Don Howe, went on to manage Arsenal; the former died in 1956, while in the job. The first player capped at full international level while with Arsenal was Caesar Jenkyns, when he appeared for Wales against Scotland on 21 March 1896. Bernard Joy moved into journalism following his football career, and authored the club's first detailed history book, Forward, Arsenal! Ronnie Rooke made 94 appearances for Arsenal and scored 70 goals; at a goalscoring rate of 0.745, he is the club's second-most prolific goalscorer.

Two players, Ray Daniel and Roger Ord, fell one short of 100 appearances for Arsenal. The list includes thirteen players who are still contracted to the club, and so can add to their totals.

Key
The list is ordered first by date of debut, and then if necessary in alphabetical order.
Appearances as a substitute are included. This feature of the game was introduced in the Football League at the start of the 1965–66 season.
Statistics are correct up to and including the match played on 31 August 2022. Where a player left the club permanently after this date, his statistics are updated to his date of leaving.

Players

Players highlighted in bold are still actively playing at Arsenal.

Footnotes

References
General

Specific

 
Arsenal
Players
Association football player non-biographical articles